KCLG may refer to:

 KCLG-LD, a defunct low-power TV station formerly licensed to serve Neosho, Missouri, USA
 KCLG-FM, the former callsign for St. George, Utah, USA station 99.9FM KONY

See also
 CLG (disambiguation)
 WCLG (disambiguation)